Carlo Lattanzio (born July 25, 1997 in La Plata, Argentina) is an Argentine professional footballer who plays for Platense, on loan from Estudiantes LP.

Career statistics

References

External links
 

1997 births
Living people
Argentine footballers
Association football forwards
Footballers from La Plata
Estudiantes de La Plata footballers
Estudiantes de Buenos Aires footballers
Central Córdoba de Santiago del Estero footballers
Club Atlético Platense footballers
Argentine Primera División players
Primera Nacional players